Krzysztof J. Cios (born 1950) is a Professor and Chair of the Department of Computer Science, School of Engineering, Virginia Commonwealth University (VCU), located in Richmond, Virginia. His research is focused on machine learning, data mining, and biomedical informatics.

Biography 
Krzysztof J. Cios, a Polish-American computer scientist, was born in Dębica, Poland. He earned his M.S. degree in electrical engineering and his Ph.D. degree in computer science, both from the AGH University of Science and Technology, Kraków, Poland. Cios also earned his D.Sc. (habilitation) degree from the Polish Academy of Sciences, Warsaw and an M.B.A. degree from the University of Toledo, Ohio.

Cios first worked at the Tadeusz Kościuszko University of Technology, Kraków, and also the International Atomic Energy Agency, Vienna, Austria. After moving to the U.S. in the 1980s he worked at the Electrical Engineering and Computer Science Department at the University of Toledo (UT). At UT he co-founded Department of Bioengineering and served as its Acting Chair before moving to Colorado. He also worked as a visiting scientist at NASA Glenn Research Center, Cleveland, Ohio. He then served as Chair of the Computer Science and Engineering Department at the University of Colorado Denver where he was instrumental in starting its Ph.D. program in Computer Science and Information Systems and getting its first-ever ABET accreditation. While in Colorado, he consulted for Lockheed Martin and Raytheon companies and was Affiliated Professor of Computer Science at the University of Colorado Boulder, where he was advisor of two doctoral students. He has also worked as a visiting professor at the Complutense University of Madrid, Spain, and at the Muroran Institute of Technology, Japan.  Currently he serves as Chair of the Computer Science Department at VCU. He started a dual Ph.D. degree program in computer science between VCU and the University of Cordoba (UCO), Spain; students who meet requirements of both universities and perform research at the other university earn two Ph.D. degrees: from VCU and UCO.  He also serves as Director of Enterprise Informatics, Office of the Vice President for Research and Innovation.

Cios has co-authored three books and over 200 journal and conference papers. His main contributions are in the areas of machine learning, computational neuroscience, and data mining; his book on the latter subject was the first one published in the U.S. (1998) and his article on uniqueness of medical data mining is frequently cited. In the area of neuroinformatics, he co-defined with Kevin Staley (Harvard Medical School) and others a dynamic Synaptic Activity Plasticity Rule, which in contrast to other plasticity rules is continuous and dynamic as it uses actual post-synaptic potential function to modify connection strength between neurons. Some of the machine learning algorithms developed with his students, such as CAIM and ur-CAIM discretization algorithms and rule algorithms for single-instance (DataSqueezer), multiple-instance (mi-DS) and one-class (OneClass-DS) learning, became popular and were implemented in open-source software platforms.

Cios has been the recipient of the Norbert Wiener Outstanding Paper Award (Kybernetes), the University of Toledo Outstanding Faculty Research Award, the Neurocomputing Best Paper Award and the Fulbright Senior Scholar Award. Cios is listed by the Kosciuszko Foundation as one of the eminent scientists of Polish origin and ancestry, is a Foreign Member of the Polish Academy of Arts and Sciences, and a Fellow of the American Institute for Medical and Biological Engineering.

Works

References

External links 
His academic home page

Virginia Commonwealth University faculty
American computer scientists
21st-century American engineers
Polish emigrants to the United States
AGH University of Science and Technology alumni
University of Toledo alumni
University of Colorado Boulder faculty
Academic staff of the Complutense University of Madrid
Living people
Fellows of the American Institute for Medical and Biological Engineering
1950 births